Juilly is the name of two communes in France:

 Juilly, in the Côte-d'Or département
 Juilly, in the Seine-et-Marne département